Once Upon a Time in Brooklyn is a 2013 American crime film written and directed by Paul Borghese, starring William DeMeo, Wass Stevens, and Louis Vanaria.

Plot
Bobby Baldano (William DeMeo) is the black sheep of his family. When he gets out of prison after serving a five-year sentence, his father (Armand Assante) has high hopes he will have a fresh start and come to work at Joseph Baldano & Sons Contracting, the legitimate and thriving multi-generational family business Bobby's grandfather built up from nothing. But Bobby's a mob connected street thug who gets caught back up in a life of inescapable crime. He has two families: one supportive and loving, the other dangerous and deadly. He must decide between his two families and  once he does, truths are revealed that Bobby always knew but was too blind to see and too afraid to face.

Cast
 William DeMeo as Bobby Baldano
 Louis Vanaria as Stan "the Jew" Gerzof
 Ice-T as Tyler Moss
 Jeffrey Atkins as Willie Davis
 Vincent Pastore as Luigi Leone
 Tony Darrow as Patsy Pirati
 Elia Monte-Brown as Rena
 Samantha Ivers as Gina
 Cathy Moriarty as Sarah Baldano
 Armand Assante as Joseph Baldano Sr.
 Charles Parshley as Joseph Baldano Jr.
 William Sweet as FBI Agent Benson
 Robert Costanzo as Lenny Leone
 Wass Stevens as Jimmy Vitigliano

References

2013 films
American crime films
2013 crime films
2010s English-language films
2010s American films